Lift is a range of soft drinks produced by The Coca-Cola Company that has been available in Australia, New Zealand, Latin America, Germany, Austria, Philippines and Eastern Europe since the 1970s, which is carbonated and flavored with fruit juice. In Australia and New Zealand, a standard bottle of Lift is lemon flavoured, whereas in Germany and other markets the default flavour is Apple. 

Lift Apple and Lift Lemon were previously part of eight international soda flavors featured and available for tasting at Club Cool in Epcot.

Availability

Australia 
Lift was introduced in Australia in the 1990s as a replacement for the Mello Yello brand. Mello Yello had replaced Leed Lemon Soda Squash in the early 1980s, which was a variant of the Leed Lemonade brand. The only flavour in the Lift range (besides limited time flavours) was Lemon. In 2015 it was rebranded as Fanta Lemon Lift and then back to the original Lift in 2016 with a flavour change, supposedly making the drink more sour.

Lift was discontinued in the Australian market in September 2022 and replaced by a new lemon flavour of Sprite with caffeine; known as Sprite Lemon+. This flavour was announced by Coca-Cola Europacific Partners on 13 September 2022, following months of rumours on social media.

Germany 
In Germany, Lift Apfelschorle consists of 55% apple juice and water without additional flavouring. Variations include Lift Apfel and Grapefruit, which contains apple and grapefruit juice.

See also
 Appletiser
 Solo (Australian soft drink)

References

Australian drinks
Lemon sodas
Soft drinks
Coca-Cola brands